"Birds Without Wings" is the debut single by English singer-songwriter David Gray, released in November 1992 under Hut Records, a label subsidiary of Virgin Records.

Background
"L's Song" and "The Light" are both included on the releases, The EPs 1992-1994 and the "Birds Without Wings" single as B-sides. The single track is also included in the compilation album, Shine: The Best of the Early Years.

The single fared poorly.

Track listing

References

1992 songs
1992 debut singles
David Gray (musician) songs
Songs written by David Gray (musician)
Hut Records singles